Alinabad (also Romanized as ‘Ālīnābād; also known as ‘Ālīābād) is a village in Zirtang Rural District, Kunani District, Kuhdasht County, Lorestan Province, Iran. At the 2006 census, its population was 60, in 12 families.

References 

Towns and villages in Kuhdasht County